Jeffrey Mirza (born 3 February 1964) is an English stand-up comedian and actor of British-Pakistani descent.

Early life
Mirza was born and brought up in East End of London, England to Pakistani parents. His family are from the Punjab region of Pakistan and are of Mughal descent. His paternal grandfather was Dr Mirza Taj Baig, a doctor with the rank of Major and one of the first Indians to be a Commissioned Officer in the British Army. His paternal grandfather (Abdur Rehman Mirza) was a Zaildar (Headman for 40 villages) in the princely state of Jammu and Kashmir before the Partition.

Mirza attended Barking Abbey Comprehensive School. At the age of 12 he was given the cane (being beaten with a stick by a teacher) for doing an impression of the American Detective Columbo. At the age of 14, Mirza had his first stint at live comedy when he told anecdotes about his summer holiday trip to Pakistan for assembly at Loxford High School. After graduating from the University of Westminster with a Bachelor in Civil Engineering degree and a master's degree in Engineering, he informally began performing with a comedy groups called The Men from ChaCha. One of their famous sketches was a dance parody of the Chippendales called "The Chappattidales".

Stand-up career
In 1993, Mirza won the Hackney Empire East West Quest and he went solo into stand-up and since then has not looked back. He has written pieces for magazines and is well known on the London comedy circuit. In 1995, he was a finalist in the BBC Open Mic Award for The Stand up Show at the Edinburgh festival. The same year (1995) he co-starred in a full-length show with Scottish Comedian Brian Higgins in a show called 'Haggis & Curry'. Since that initial success he gave up his job as a structural engineer and began work as a full-time stand-up comedian. In the Asian comedy field he has worked with and for the 'One Nation. ..lnnit!' Team based at Watermans in Brentford and has also played all the major comedy clubs and is a regular at Jongleurs Comedy Clubs.

In 2003, he performed his show Walking With Muslims at the Edinburgh Festival Fringe. The show 'Walking with Muslims' coincided with the 2003 Iraq War and gained worldwide acclaim as Jeff Mirza appeared as dictator Saddam Hussein who was on the run at the time. He has played the comedy circuit in London including Jongleurs and The Comedy Store. He has performed all over the world, and is the first British Muslim comedian ever to perform stand-up comedy to sell out shows in Saudi Arabia.

He is regularly involved with interfaith dialogue between different communities and often called in to lighten-up and moderate contentious debates between multi-faith conservatives.

In July 2011, Mirza toured four UK cities in the Peace Youth and Community Trust's (PYCT) first Muslim Comedy Tour, alongside Humza Arshad, Prince Abdi and Nabil Abdul Rashid. From June to 28 August 2011, he presented a series of eight programmes in the world's first interfaith game show called Faith Off on the Islam Channel at the Edinburgh Festival Fringe in Underbelly, Cowgate, Edinburgh. He also performed his show Jihad: Heresy Or Hearsay. He has also appeared at the Leicester Comedy Festival and Glastonbury Festival.

Mirza is now developing a television sitcom and writing new material for a world tour.

Acting career
Mirza's film credits include "What's Love Got to do with it", Blinded by the Light, Mogul Mowgli, It Was an Accident and Desi Boyz.

His television appearances include White Teeth, Chuckle Vision, Murder in Mind and Doctors.

Awards and recognition
In 1995, reached the finals off the BBC Open Mic Award.

In 2001, Mirza won the "Best Comedian" award in the BT Ethnic Multicultural Media Academy Awards. In 2003, he won the Ethnic Multicultural Media Academy Comedy award which was held at London's Dorchester Hotel where the chief guest was Sir Richard Attenborough. The other nominees were Richard Blackwood, Felix Dexter and Gina Yashere. In 2018 Jeff Mirza was Awarded a BEFFTA Legends Award.

Personal life
Mirza is a West Ham United football fan. He is married and has children.

Filmography

Television

Film

See also
Islamic humour
British Pakistanis
List of British Pakistanis

References

External links

Gibbons, Fiachra. Jeff Mirza: Walking With Muslims. The Guardian. 4 August 2003
Jeff Mirza, British Comedian Dressed As Gaddafi, Attacked. The Huffington Post. 21 August 2011
Comedian attacked while wearing Gadhafi costume. The San Francisco Examiner. 21 August 2011
Jeff Mirza’s Jihad; Heresy or Hearsay?. Underbelly, Cowgate, Edinburgh. 4 to 28 August 2011

1964 births
Living people
English Muslims
English people of Pakistani descent
English male comedians
English stand-up comedians
English impressionists (entertainers)
Muslim male comedians
British comedians of Pakistani descent
English male actors
English male television actors
English male film actors
English male actors of South Asian descent
British film actors of Pakistani descent
20th-century English male actors
21st-century English male actors
Comedians from London
Male actors from London
Alumni of the University of London